Classic Albums: Nirvana – Nevermind is a documentary DVD released by Eagle Vision in March 2005, as part of the Classic Albums series. It features interviews specifically for this release with Nirvana band members Dave Grohl and Krist Novoselic, as well as Nevermind album producer Butch Vig about the recording of the album. Other interview highlights include Garry Gersh (A&R DGC Records), Jonathan Ponneman and Nils Bernstein (Sub Pop Records), Thurston Moore (Sonic Youth) and Jack Endino.

DVD features

Track listing (featuring excerpts from and the making of)
 "Smells Like Teen Spirit"
 "In Bloom"
 "Come as You Are"
 "Breed"
 "Lithium"
 "Polly"
 "Territorial Pissings"
 "Drain You"
 "Lounge Act"
 "Stay Away"
 "On a Plain"
 "Something in the Way"

Special feature information

Drain You [the story behind the making of the track]
Dave Grohl Joins Nirvana
Going to Record in LA
Making of the 'Smells Like Teen Spirit' Video
'Polly' [live in concert]
Nevermind: The Album Sleeve

Chart positions

Certifications

See also
 Nevermind
 Nevermind It's an Interview
 Nirvana discography

References

Classic Albums films
Nirvana (band) video albums
2005 video albums